NXT UK TakeOver was a series of periodic United Kingdom professional wrestling events produced by WWE, an American professional wrestling promotion based in Connecticut. The events were produced exclusively for the promotion's NXT UK brand division, a sister brand of NXT based in the United Kingdom, and were livestreamed on the WWE Network. NXT UK TakeOver events served as the brand's counterpart to the main NXT brand's TakeOver shows.

Only three NXT UK TakeOver events were produced. A fourth was planned for 2020 and delayed to 2021 but ultimately canceled due to the COVID-19 pandemic that began in mid-March 2020. In late 2021, the main NXT's TakeOver series was discontinued after NXT was rebranded as NXT 2.0. The NXT UK brand was dissolved in September 2022 for the relaunch of NXT Europe in 2023.

History
The first live WWE specials held in the United Kingdom were the United Kingdom Championship Tournament and United Kingdom Championship Special in 2017, and a second United Kingdom Championship Tournament in 2018. These events aired exclusively on the WWE Network. Soon after the establishment of the NXT UK brand in June 2018 followed by its own television program in October, the brand began hosting its own "TakeOver" events on the WWE Network—TakeOver was the name for the main NXT's periodic live specials. The first NXT UK TakeOver was TakeOver: Blackpool in January 2019.

Only one NXT UK TakeOver event had to be cancelled. TakeOver: Dublin was originally set to air live from the 3Arena in Dublin, Ireland on 26 April 2020 and would have been the first TakeOver held outside the United Kingdom. The event was initially rescheduled to 25 October 2020 due to the COVID-19 pandemic, which began affecting all of WWE's programming in mid-March that year. However, due to the ongoing pandemic, the event was rescheduled once again, this time to 20 June 2021. On 30 April, however, WWE confirmed that the event had been cancelled.

No further NXT UK TakeOver events were scheduled following the cancellation of TakeOver: Dublin. The main NXT's TakeOver series was also discontinued in late 2021. NXT UK was dissolved in September 2022 for the relaunch of NXT Europe in 2023.

Events

See also 
 List of WWE pay-per-view and WWE Network events

References

External links 
 Official website of NXT UK

 
WWE lists